Anapachydiscus is an extinct cephalopod genus from the Upper Cretaceous, Santonian - Maastrichtian of Europe, Africa, Madagascar, S.India, N Z, Calif. Mexico, Argentina, and the Antarctic belonging to the ammonoid family Pachydiscidae.

Anapachydiscus has a rather involute shell with a broad to moderately compressed whorl section.  Early whorls smooth, intermediary develop straight or slightly curved, radial ribs that thicken toward the umbilicus. Outer whorls may again be smooth, or have coarse ribs so as to resemble Eupachydiscus.

References
Treatise on invertebrate Paleontology, Part L, Mollusca 4. Mesozoic Ammonoidea. Geological Society of America and Univ. Kansas Press (1957)
Anapachydiscus-Paleodb 5/02/11

Late Cretaceous ammonites of North America
Coniacian genus first appearances
Maastrichtian genus extinctions
Desmoceratoidea
Ammonitida genera